Arctosa tbilisiensis is a wolf spider species in the genus Arctosa found in Europe (Bulgaria, Greece to Georgia).

See also 
 List of Lycosidae species

References

External links 

tbilisiensis
Spiders of Europe
Spiders of Georgia (country)
Spiders of Asia
Spiders described in 1946